This is a list of presidents of New York University, a research and teaching institution in New York City. The current president Andrew D. Hamilton is the former Vice-Chancellor of the University of Oxford and also a former Provost of Yale University. He took office on January 1, 2016.

New York University presidents

References

New York University-related lists
New York